The Pretty Toney Album is the fourth studio album by American hip hop artist Ghostface. The album was released on April 20, 2004, by Def Jam. It is the only album from the artist to be released solely under the title of "Ghostface" ("Killah" is entirely omitted in any reference to his name on the packaging), but it is otherwise a normal Ghostface Killah release in line with the rest of his catalogue.

The album cover is a photograph taken from his performance of the song "Summertime" with Beyoncé at Jay-Z's farewell concert at Madison Square Garden in November 2003. It is an interpolation of the cover of Doug E. Fresh's album The World's Greatest Entertainer. The oversized jewelry he is seen wearing in the photograph was given to him prior to his performance by rapper Slick Rick, as seen in the film "Fade to Black."

Critical reception

The Pretty Toney Album received critical acclaim from music critics. At Metacritic, which assigns a normalized rating out of 100 to reviews from critics, the album received an average score of 84, which indicates "universal acclaim", based on 14 reviews. David Jeffries of AllMusic said, "The Pretty Toney Album has a lack of Wu-related references on it. It's Ghostface's album entirely and all the better for it." Tiny Mix Tapes said, "It exemplifies all of the elements that Ghostface has been successful with in the past. Unfortunately, The Pretty Toney Album falls short in replacing what Raekwon had contributed to Ghost's previous album releases, causing the album to feel essentially incomplete."

Rollie Pemberton of Pitchfork said, "Expectedly, minor shortcomings hold the record back from classic status. The lack of his usual obligatory Raekwon collaboration hurts Pretty Toney'''s variety, and the skits, despite featuring topics and idiosyncratic raps far above the standards of his contemporaries, tend to bog down the album's progress. But all things considered, Pretty Toney far surpasses 2001's Bulletproof Wallets'', finally finding the missing link between street cred and commercial respect."

Track listing

Sample credits
"Intro" contains a sample of "Tobacco Road" by Tommy Youngblood.
"Biscuits" contains a sample of "I Can't Stand Up For Falling Down" by Sam & Dave.
"Kunta Fly Shit" contains a sample of "Survival" by Annette Peacock.
"Beat The Clock" contains a sample of "Since I Fell For You" by Laura Lee.
"Metal Lungies" contains a sample of "Nobody Knows" by Operation Breadbasket Orchestra and Choir.
"Bathtub" (skit) contains a sample of "Not On The Outside" by The Moments.
"Save Me Dear" contains a sample of "(You) Got What I Need" by Freddie Scott.
"It's Over" contains a sample of "I'm Afraid The Masquerade Is Over" by David Porter.
"Tush" contains a sample of "Naked Truth" by The Best of Both Worlds.
"Last Night" (skit) contains a sample of "Last Night Changed It All" by Esther Williams.
"Holla" contains a sample of "La La (Means I Love You)" by The Delfonics.
"Ghostface" contains a sample of "AJ Scratch" by Kurtis Blow.
"Be This Way" contains a sample of "(We'll Always Be) Together" by Billy Stewart.
"The Letter" (skit) contains a sample of "Sunday" by Silvia Robinson.
"Tooken Back" contains a sample of "Take Me Back" by The Emotions.
"Run" contains a sample of "Hogin Machine" by Les Baxter.
"Love" contains a sample of "Statue of a Fool" by David Ruffin.

Charts

References

2004 albums
Ghostface Killah albums
Def Jam Recordings albums
Albums produced by Nottz
Albums produced by No I.D.
Albums produced by K-Def
Albums produced by RZA
Albums produced by Emile Haynie
Albums produced by True Master